El Dorado Lake is a reservoir on the Walnut River  northeast of El Dorado in the Flint Hills region of Kansas. Built and managed by the U.S. Army Corps of Engineers, it is used for flood control, recreation, and water supply. El Dorado State Park is located on its shore.

History
The Flood Control Act of 1965 authorized construction of El Dorado Lake. The U.S. Army Corps of Engineers held groundbreaking ceremonies in September 1973, and construction began the following month. The reservoir became fully operational for flood control June 29, 1981.

Construction of El Dorado Lake incorporated two pre-existing smaller reservoirs:  Bluestem Lake and the original El Dorado Lake. The original El Dorado Lake was built on Satchel Creek in 1927 as a water supply for the community of El Dorado. Bluestem Lake was built on Bemis Creek in the 1950s. The dams of both reservoirs were breached during the building of the larger El Dorado Lake and their waters subsequently inundated. The remnants of Bluestem Lake's dam are still visible in the Shady Creek arm of the present-day reservoir.

Geography
It lies in the Flint Hills in south-central Kansas. The entirety of the reservoir lies within Butler County.

The reservoir is impounded at its southwestern end by El Dorado Lake Dam. The Walnut River is both the reservoir's primary inflow from the north and outflow to the southwest. Smaller tributaries include:  Gilmore Branch and Cole Creek from the north, Durechen Creek from the northeast, and Satchel Creek, Bemis Creek, and Shady Creek from the east.

The Kansas Turnpike (Interstate 35) runs northeast-southwest across the northern end of the lake and then parallel to its northwestern shore. Kansas Highway 177 runs north-south across the lake's eastern arms. Boulder Bluff Road, a paved county road, runs around the dam to the south, connecting with Shady Creek Access Road, another paved county road, which runs east-west immediately south of the reservoir.

The reservoir's namesake, the city of El Dorado, is located just southwest of the dam.

Hydrography
The surface area, surface elevation, and water volume of the reservoir fluctuate based on inflow and local climatic conditions. In terms of capacity, the Corps of Engineers vertically divides the reservoir into a set of pools based on volume and water level, and the reservoir is considered full when filled to the capacity of its conservation pool.

Infrastructure
An uncontrolled,  spillway is located near the northwest end of the dam.

Management
The Tulsa District of the U.S. Army Corps of Engineers manages the dam and reservoir. The KDWP also manages boating on the reservoir surface and local fisheries.

Parks and recreation

El Dorado State Park is divided into four areas spread around the shore of the southern portion of the reservoir:  the Bluestem Point Area is located between the reservoir's two eastern arms; the Boulder Bluff Area lies along the western shore; the Shady Creek Area is located on the south shore of the reservoir's southeastern arm; the Walnut River Area lies immediately southwest of the dam. All four areas include boat ramps, camping facilities, and hiking trails. In addition, the Bluestem Point Area hosts a bait shop and a swimming beach, a marina operates in the Shady Creek Area, and the Walnut River Area includes an amphitheater and swimming pond.

El Dorado Lake is open for sport fishing.

Wildlife
Fish species resident in El Dorado Lake include blue and channel catfish, rainbow trout, walleye, white bass, white crappie, and wiper. Two invasive species, the white perch and the zebra mussel, live in the lake as well. Game animals living on land around the reservoir include beavers, bobcats, coyotes, deer, doves, pheasants, prairie chickens, quail, rabbits, raccoons, squirrels, and turkeys.

See also

 List of Kansas state parks
 List of lakes, reservoirs, and dams in Kansas
 List of rivers of Kansas

References

External links
Official
 El Dorado Lake, U.S. Army Corps of Engineers
 El Dorado Lake Recreation Areas, U.S. Army Corps of Engineers
  El Dorado State Park, Kansas Department of Wildlife, Parks and Tourism
  El Dorado Wildlife Area, Kansas Department of Wildlife, Parks and Tourism
Maps
 Butler County Maps: Current, Historic, KDOT

`

Reservoirs in Kansas
Protected areas of Butler County, Kansas
Bodies of water of Butler County, Kansas
El Dorado, Kansas